The following is a list of FCC-licensed radio stations in the U.S. state of Alabama, which can be sorted by their call signs, frequencies, cities of license, licensees, and programming formats.

List of radio stations

Defunct
 WAAO-AM
 WACD
 WACM-LP
 WAQG
 WARI
 WBRC-FM
 WBYE
 WCMA
 WCOC
 WCOX
 WDLK
 WERH
 WERH-FM
 WFBH-LP
 WGEA
 WGYJ
 WGYN
 WHMZ-LP
 WIQR
 WIZD-LP
 WJDB
 WJHX 
 WJLQ-LP
 WJSD-LP
 WJSR 
 WJWC
 WKDG
 WKIJ
 WKOC-LP
 WKXM
 WKYD
 WLHQ
 WLVN
 WMFC
 WPPT
 WPRN
 WQHC
 WQLS
 WQXD-LP
 WREN
 WRJX
 WRMZ-LP
 WSMX-LP
 WTID
 WTOH
 WTQX
 WTXQ
 WUAC-LP
 WULA
 WVPL
 WWFC-LP
 WWWH
 WYDK
 WYJD
 WYVC
 WZCT
 WZNN
 WZTN
 WZTQ
 WZZX

See also
 Alabama media
 List of newspapers in Alabama
 List of television stations in Alabama
 Media in cities in Alabama: Birmingham, Huntsville, Mobile, Montgomery, Tuscaloosa
 Alabama Broadcasters Association

References

Bibliography

External links

  (Directory ceased in 2017)
 Alabama Historical Radio Society (est. 1989)
 Birmingham Black Radio Museum (est. circa 1992)

Images

 
Alabama
Radio stations